Tomáš Kučera (born 13 February 1977) is Czech former professional football forward. He made over 150 appearances  in the Gambrinus liga. He played international football at under-21 level for Czech Republic U21 and represented his country in Football at the 2000 Summer Olympics.

References

External links
 
 Player's profile at iDNES.cz 

Living people
1977 births
Association football forwards
Czech footballers
Czech Republic under-21 international footballers
Footballers at the 2000 Summer Olympics
Olympic footballers of the Czech Republic
Czech First League players
1. FK Příbram players
SK Slavia Prague players
FC Viktoria Plzeň players
FK Drnovice players